The Majesty Building, also known as the I-4 Eyesore and Eyesore on I-4, is an 18-story,  office building located at 123 East Central Parkway, Altamonte Springs, Florida.

History 
Construction began in January 2001. It remained a building shell (bare floors and support beams) for over a decade. Given its proximity to Interstate 4, it became known as the "I-4 Eyesore".  Glass windows that enclosed the shell were later installed.

Claud Bowers (CEO of the religious independent TV station WACX SuperChannel 55) owns the building, which is slated to hold broadcasting studios, along with office and retail space. The building has been financed without debt, with the help of donors and partners. The price tag for the project topped $40 million.

Construction resumed in 2018. As of the end of summer 2019, the adjacent I-4 Ultimate project has been cited as a source of additional delays. As such, construction is still on-going with an expected completion date of fall 2022. As of March 2023 construction is still not finished.

References

Buildings and structures in Seminole County, Florida
Office buildings in Florida